Commersonia breviseta is a species of flowering plant in the family Malvaceae and endemic to eastern Australia. It is a dwarf shrub with densely-hairy, egg-shaped to narrow elliptic leaves that are paler on the lower surface, and flowers with five white sepals with pink edges, five smaller pale yellow petals and dark red stamens.

Description
The leaves are covered with white, star-like hairs and are paler on the lower surface. The stamens are dark red and five white staminodes surround the central stye.

Taxonomy
Commersonia breviseta was first formally described in 2008 by Carolyn F. Wilkins and Lachlan Mackenzie Copeland in the journal Telopea from material collected in Girraween National Park in 2004. The specific epithet (breviseta) means "short bristles" and refers to the bristles on the fruit.

Distribution and habitat
This commersonia grows in rocky places in heath or woodland and occurs from Girraween National Park in far south-eastern Queensland to Genoa in far north-eastern Victoria, and is most common on the tablelands of New South Wales.

Ecology
Commersonia breviseta appears to be killed by fire but to germinate abundantly after, then appears to become senescent after about five years.

References

breviseta
Flora of New South Wales
Flora of Queensland
Flora of Victoria (Australia)
Plants described in 2008